The Suzuki Mighty Boy is an automobile which was produced by Japanese automaker Suzuki from 1983 to 1988. It was the only "bonnet type" pick up (or coupé utility) ever sold in the 550 cc era of the Kei class. It was classified as a commercial vehicle in Japan (and in Australia) so as to benefit from lower taxes for such vehicles, but its utilitarian values were certainly restricted. While the Mighty Boy was not a runaway success and was never replaced in the Suzuki lineup, the car still has a dedicated following in Japan.

History

The rear-engined Suzuki Cervo SS40, a small sports coupé (or "Personal Car"), had been replaced by a new, front-wheel drive version based on the recently updated Alto/Fronte in June 1982. Suzuki then surprised everybody by developing a small Coupé Utility version based on the sporty Cervo. Based on the principles and regulations of the Japanese keijidōsha class of vehicles, the Mighty Boy was released in February 1983. While retaining the look of the Cervo with its wide B-pillars, the Mighty Boy had its own rear design. A small flat bed of no more than 600 mm length was only of limited utility, but the low slung driving position was both more comfortable and completely unlike any of the cab forward pickups in the Japanese micro truck market. The (comparatively) spacious cabin also offered sliding and reclining seats, and a reasonably large luggage area behind the seats.

The Mighty Boy was equipped with a 543 cc, SOHC three-cylinder transversely mounted engine (F5A). However, unlike its cousin, the Cervo, no turbo was available for the Mighty Boy.  Driving the front wheels through a four-speed manual or optional two-speed automatic gearbox, the single-carb F5A motor delivered  JIS at 6,000 rpm of power at the flywheel. The model designation for the Suzuki Mighty Boy is SS40T.

First generation Mighty Boys were fitted with 10" wheels, and sported a horizontally finned grille, identical to the Cervo. While the Cervo used rectangular headlights, the Mighty Boy, as befitting the cheapest automobile available in Japan, used cheaper round sealed-beam units on most versions. The dashboard, seats, and steering wheel were not the Cervo units; the Mighty Boy instead received the lower cost units from the Alto Van (SS40V). Facelift PS-L models received unique seats, which although still similar to those featured in the Cervo CS/G featured a customised embossed "Mighty Boy" logo.

The range consisted of two variants, largely corresponding to the Cervo CS and CS-D/CS-QD:
 PS-A - This 'base' model carried over the 10" wheels from the first generation Mighty Boy and was available with a four-speed manual transmission only.
 PS-L and PS-QL - This model was equipped with bucket seats, chrome roof tie-down rails, a coupé-style rear deck cover, and a tachometer. In contrast to the base model, it also offered the choice of a two-speed automatic (PS-QL).

In early 1985 the facelifted Mighty Boy received minor cosmetic upgrades, including a restyled front grille and mirrors. The costlier PS-L variant also benefitted from a five-speed manual gearbox, new seats, larger 12" wheels, and rectangular headlights. Australian cars were all of the facelift type and claimed  and 43.1 Nm at 3,500 rpm - more or less identical to the Japanese specifications.

By January 1988, a new Cervo had been presented and the SS40C was discontinued, bringing with it the end of the Mighty Boy.

Export markets

The only regular export markets for the Suzuki Mighty Boy were Australia and Cyprus between 1985 and 1988. Imported through Suzuki/Ateco, Australia received a hybrid of the Japanese PS-A and PS-QL second generation Mighty Boy that included chrome roof rails, bucket seats and 12" wheels. However, it did not include such items as a tachometer or the five-speed manual gearbox. The manual version sold for A$5,795 when introduced to Australia, the cheapest automobile available there at the time. 

About 2,800 were imported, but only 300 to 400 remain.

Specifications
Model designation: SS40T
Engine model: F5A
Bore x Stroke (mm): 62x60
Capacity: 543 cc
Power output:  JIS at 6,000 rpm in Japanese specifications
Compression ratio: 8.5:1

Notes

References 
 Car Graphic: Car Archives Vol. 11, '80s Japanese Cars. Nigensha: 2007. 
 Kazuo Ozeki, Suzuki Story: Small Cars, Big Ambitions. Miki Press: 2007.

External links
 Team MightyBoy - An Australian-based MightyBoy enthusiast group

MightyBoy
Kei cars
Kei trucks
Cars introduced in 1983
Cars discontinued in 1988